This is an incomplete list of uprisings in the Gulag:
Parbig uprising near Narym, 1931

SS Dalstroy explosion at Nakhodka Bay, 1946
Kolyma rebellion, 1946
Vorkuta uprising, 1948
Nizhni Aturyakh camp, Berlag, uprising, 1949

Norilsk uprising, 1953
Vorkuta uprising, 1953
Kengir uprising, 1954

References